Graceful 4 is the first Japanese studio album (second overall) by South Korean girl group The Grace, released on November 14, 2007.

"One More Time, OK?" was served as the lead single of the album, which is a Japanese version of their Korean song with the same title. The album includes their five Japanese singles was previously released from 2006–2007 and the album has a total of 14 tracks. The album sold a total of 1,622 copies in Japan, peaking at No. 103 in the Oricon charts.

Track listing

CD
"Piranha"
"One More Time, OK?"
"Just for One Day" 
"I'll Kiss You"
"Boomerang"
"Pardon Me??"
"5cm"
"Sweet Flower"
"Get on the Floor" 
"The Club" 
"Juicy Love" 
"My Everything"

DVD
"One More Time, OK?" 
"Piranha" 
"Juicy Love" 
"Sweet Flower" 
"The Club" 
"Boomerang"

External links
  Official Website

2007 albums
The Grace (band) albums